

356001–356100 

|-bgcolor=#f2f2f2
| colspan=4 align=center | 
|}

356101–356200 

|-bgcolor=#f2f2f2
| colspan=4 align=center | 
|}

356201–356300 

|-id=217
| 356217 Clymene ||  || Clymene was the wife of Nauplius, and mother of Palamedes, Oeax and Nausimedon. Palamedes joined the Greeks in the expedition against Troy. Name suggested by A. Mimeev. || 
|}

356301–356400 

|-bgcolor=#f2f2f2
| colspan=4 align=center | 
|}

356401–356500 

|-bgcolor=#f2f2f2
| colspan=4 align=center | 
|}

356501–356600 

|-bgcolor=#f2f2f2
| colspan=4 align=center | 
|}

356601–356700 

|-bgcolor=#f2f2f2
| colspan=4 align=center | 
|}

356701–356800 

|-bgcolor=#f2f2f2
| colspan=4 align=center | 
|}

356801–356900 

|-id=863
| 356863 Maathai ||  || Wangari Maathai (1940–2011), the first African woman to receive the Nobel Peace Prize and the first female professor ever in her home country of Kenya. || 
|}

356901–357000 

|-id=975
| 356975 Aspriliopacelli ||  || Asprilio Pacelli (1570–1623) was an Italian composer who was Maestro di Cappella at the Collegio Germanico (Rome) from 1595 to 1601, and at Saint Peter's Basilica in 1602.  He then was called to Warsaw by King Sigismund to be director of his Royal Chapel in 1603. || 
|}

References 

356001-357000